The 1966 Rice Owls football team represented Rice University during the 1966 NCAA University Division football season. In its 27th and final season under head coach Jess Neely, the team compiled a 2–8 record, finished last in the conference, and was outscored by a total of 211 to 154. The team played its home games at Rice Stadium in Houston.

The team's statistical leaders included Robert Hailey with 859 passing yards, Robby Shelton with 607 rushing yards, Glen Hine with 323 receiving yards, and L.V. Benningfield and Robby Shelton with 36 points each. Two Rice players were selected by the Associated Press (AP) as first-team players on the 1966 All-Southwest Conference football team: fullback Lester Lehman and safety Chuck Latourette.

Schedule

References

Rice
Rice Owls football seasons
Rice Owls football